The Association of European Sommeliers or AES is a non-profit organization founded in 2004 to promote the profession of sommelier in Europe. It was founded by the sommelier Brigitte Leloup, presided by the chief sommelier Thierry Corona, and historically sponsored by the oenophile actor Pierre Richard.

History
The Association of European sommeliers was founded in November 2004 by the sommelier Brigitte Leloup based in the Casino 2000 in Mondorf-les-Bains in Luxembourg, and by sommeliers from elsewhere in Europe.

The purpose of this European organization is to gather European wine business professionals (sommeliers, wine sellers, butlers, etc.) around the world's common wine values.

References

Business organisations based in Luxembourg
Pan-European trade and professional organizations
Sommeliers